Harry Trainer  (1872 – May 1924) was a Welsh international footballer. He was part of the Wales national football team, playing three matches and scoring two goals. He played his first match on 16 March 1895 against Ireland and his last match on 23 March 1895 against Scotland. At club level, he played for Leicester Fosse and was topscorer of the team of the 1895–96 season with 14 goals.

Personal life
In January 1901, Trainer was sentenced to nine months imprisonment with hard labour for breaking and entering, and theft of jewellery.

See also
 List of Wales international footballers (alphabetical)

References

1872 births
1924 deaths
Footballers from Wrexham
Leicester City F.C. players
Welsh footballers
Wales international footballers
Wrexham A.F.C. players
Association football forwards
Westminster Rovers F.C. players
Wrexham Victoria F.C. players
Wrexham Grosvenor F.C. players